Storm Riders may refer to:

 The Storm Rider, a 1957 American Western film
 The Grand Duel, also known as Storm Rider, a 1972 Spaghetti Western film 
 Storm Riders (1982 film), a documentary featuring surfers and windsurfers
 Storm Riders (module), 1990 adventure module
 The Storm Riders, a 1998 Hong Kong film based on a comic book called Fung Wan
 Storm Rider (2013 film), an American family drama film starring Kevin Sorbo
 Storm Riders, 2019 South African movie.
 Storm Rider (G.I. Joe)
 Storm Riders (TV series), program on The Weather Channel

See also 

 "Riders on the Storm", a song by The Doors on their 1971 album, L.A. Woman